Allyson Araújo Santos (born 28 January 1982), known as just Allyson, is a Brazilian footballer who plays for Central.

Biography
Born in Aracaju, Sergipe, Allyson played for Bahia at 2005 Campeonato Baiano, 2005 Copa do Brasil and 2005 Campeonato Brasileiro Série B before moved abroad. He is best fast shooter (127.7 km/h).

Turkey
Allyson signed a 3-year contract with Çaykur Rizespor in August 2005. He played 13 matches in the first season and released in October 2006. 
In January 2007 he signed a 1-year deal with Náutico of Recife. He played for the team at 2007 Campeonato Pernambucano, 2007 Copa do Brasil and 2007 Campeonato Brasileiro Série A.

In July 2007, he returned to Turkey for Denizlispor, and in January 2008 left for Manisaspor.

Return to Brazil
In March 2009 signed a contract until November for Esporte Clube Juventude. In January 2010, Allyson mutually terminated his contract with Manisaspor, which due to expire in June 2010, and signed a contract with Santa Cruz until the end of 2010 Campeonato Pernambucano.

In August 2010 he left for Fortaleza of 2010 Campeonato Brasileiro Série C.

References

External links
 Profile at Turkish Football Federation
 Futpedia 
 

1982 births
Living people
Association football central defenders
People from Aracaju
Brazilian footballers
Süper Lig players
Cypriot First Division players
Esporte Clube Bahia players
Çaykur Rizespor footballers
Clube Náutico Capibaribe players
Denizlispor footballers
Manisaspor footballers
Santa Cruz Futebol Clube players
Fortaleza Esporte Clube players
F.C. Penafiel players
Ethnikos Achna FC players
Brazilian expatriate footballers
Expatriate footballers in Turkey
Brazilian expatriate sportspeople in Turkey
Expatriate footballers in Cyprus
Brazilian expatriate sportspeople in Cyprus
Expatriate footballers in Portugal
Sportspeople from Sergipe